This is a list of candidates of the 2022 South Australian state election.

Retiring MPs

Liberal 

 Stephan Knoll MHA (Schubert) – announced 1 December 2020
 Peter Treloar MHA (Flinders) – announced 1 December 2020
 Rob Lucas MLC – announced 20 March 2018

Labor
 Jon Gee MHA (Taylor) – announced 27 January 2021

Independent
 John Dawkins MLC – elected as Liberal, announced 3 February 2020

House of Assembly 

Sitting members of the South Australian House of Assembly are shown in bold text. Successful candidates are highlighted in the relevant colour. Where there is possible confusion, an asterisk is used.

Legislative Council 

Sitting members of the South Australian Legislative Council are shown in bold text. Eleven of twenty-two seats were up for election.

See also
Members of the South Australian House of Assembly, 2018–2022
Members of the South Australian House of Assembly, 2022–2026
Members of the South Australian Legislative Council, 2018–2022
Members of the South Australian Legislative Council, 2022–2026

References

2022 elections in Australia
Candidates for South Australian state elections